Yevgeni Yevgenyevich Durnev (born 4 August 1972 in Vladimir) is a Russian professional football coach and a former player. He works as a deputy director of sports with FC Torpedo Vladimir.

As a player, he made his debut in the Soviet Second League in 1990 for FC Torpedo Vladimir.

Honours
 Russian Second Division, Zone West best manager: 2010.

References

1972 births
People from Vladimir, Russia
Living people
Soviet footballers
Russian footballers
Russia under-21 international footballers
Association football midfielders
Russian football managers
FC KAMAZ Naberezhnye Chelny players
Russian Premier League players
FC Lokomotiv Nizhny Novgorod players
FC Elista players
FC Torpedo Moscow players
FC Tyumen managers
FC Torpedo Vladimir players
Sportspeople from Vladimir Oblast